This is a list of German television-related events in 1956.

Events
24 May - Germany enters the Eurovision Song Contest for the first time with "Im Wartesaal zum großen Glück", performed by Walter Andreas Schwarz and "So geht das jede Nacht", performed by Freddy Quinn.

Debuts

Television shows

1950s
Tagesschau (1952–present)

Ending this year

Births
23 February
Sabine Sauer, TV host & journalist
Reinhold Beckmann, TV host, football commentator & singer
24 July - Carmen Nebel, TV host

Deaths